John Akehurst is a photographer who specializes in fashion, beauty, and advertising.

Biography 
He studied mathematics at the University of Nottingham. After graduation he moved to New York where worked as an assistant to Steven Meisel and Albert Watson. He moved to London, eventually publishing the story "The Egg" in The Face in 1997.

References

External links 
 
 

American photographers
Living people
Year of birth missing (living people)